Vernate is a comune (municipality) in the Province of Milan in the Italian region Lombardy, located about  southwest of Milan.

The municipality of Vernate contains the frazione (subdivision) Pasturago.

Vernate borders the following municipalities: Noviglio, Noviglio, Rosate, Rosate, Binasco, Calvignasco, Casarile, Casorate Primo, Rognano, Trovo.

Demographic evolution

References

External links
 www.comune.vernate.mi.it/01Vernate/01_Vernate.htm

Cities and towns in Lombardy